Tuwari is a Sepik language spoken in Sandaun Province, Papua-New Guinea.

References

Languages of Sandaun Province
Walio languages